Haplogroup P1 may refer to:

Haplogroup P1 (Y-DNA)
Haplogroup P (mtDNA)